The Big Ten Conference Player of the Year is a baseball award given to the Big Ten Conference's most outstanding player. The award was first given following the 1982 season, with both pitchers and position players eligible. After the 1994 season, the Big Ten Conference Baseball Pitcher of the Year award was created to honor the most outstanding pitcher.

Key

Winners

Winners by school

Footnotes
 Wisconsin discontinued its baseball program after the 1991 season.

References

Awards established in 1983
Player
NCAA Division I baseball conference players of the year